Tropical Storm Cimaron, known in the Philippines as Tropical Storm Isang,  was a weak tropical storm, with only a pressure of 1000 hPa and 45 mph. It formed and made landfall in the Philippines, especially Luzon, and China, as well as affecting Southern Taiwan during its nearby passage. Despite being weak, the storm caused extensive damage amounting to approximately $325 million in China, as well as 6 deaths in total, with 2 in the Philippines.

Meteorological history 

In late July 14, a tropical low was formed near Eastern Luzon, as it was gradually moving eastward, the tropical low's deep convection started to wrap around forming a better-defined circulation. Still as a tropical depression, finally on July 16, a tropical depression generated over the western North Pacific to the east of the Luzon Island of the Philippines. The Joint Typhoon Warning Center (JTWC) categorized the depression as 08W, and the Philippine Atmospheric, Geophysical and Astronomical Services Administration (PAGASA) promptly named it the Philippine name Isang.

As the tropical cyclone which will soon become Cimaron, was currently moving northeastward, still as a tropical depression, it made landfall in Northern Luzon at the same intensity. Many raindrops fell from the sky while thunderstorms spread around the area. A strike of lightning spawned and struck the province of Ilocos Sur, killing 2 people and leaving an extra 2 more injured.

After its landfall in the Philippines, the cyclone entered the Bashi Channel. As it did, it also entered conducive conditions. Due to the favorable ocean conditions, the cyclone's intensity was upgraded to tropical storm status. Simultaneously, it was named Cimaron (1308) by the JMA on early July  17. Cimaron continued to move northwest and entered the northeastern South China Sea, where it affected areas of Taiwan, but no fatalities, injuries, or any missing people were reported around that area. It afterwards began to turn towards the north and approached the south coast of Fujian. It finally made its last landfall as a weak tropical storm of the Zhangpu County on the date of July  18, with the maximum wind speed at its center reaching at least 45 mph at its landfall.

After landfall, Cimaron continued to move in a northwestern direction, with its intensity decreasing very rapidly, and it weakened into a tropical depression within Fujian on July 18. The Japan Meteorological Agency stopped monitoring the storm at 21:00 UTC on July 18, as it was declared it had dissipated by then.

Preparations and impact

Philippines
On July 17, a lightning incident within the Philippine province of Ilocos Sur, left two people dead and two others injured.

China

300,000 people were evacuated due to safety. As previously mentioned, a lightning incident occurred in the Philippines killing 2 people. 20 million people were affected by the cyclone, and approximately 9 million people were relocated around the landfall area. An intense and unusual thunderstorm by the cyclone produced 406 lightning strikes in under 2 hours in Xiamen. Direct economic losses from the storm amounted to ¥1.98 billion (US$322 million).

Aftermath 
Many torrential rains cascaded down to land in Fujian. Many roads were flooded and houses damaged due to Cimaron's passage. Areas near Cimaron's landfall had experienced flooding that can happen once in every 500 years. Many powers lines were cut, as well as houses were also destroyed.

See also 
 Tropical Storm Linfa (2009)
 Tropical Storm Hagibis (2014)
 Tropical Storm Merbok (2017)

References

External links

JMA General Information of Tropical Storm Cimaron (1308) from Digital Typhoon
JMA Best Track Data of Tropical Storm Cimaron (1308) 
JTWC Best Track Data of Tropical Storm 08W (Cimaron)
08W.CIMARON from the U.S. Naval Research Laboratory

2013 Pacific typhoon season
2013 disasters in the Philippines
Typhoons in the Philippines
Western Pacific tropical storms
Cimaron